Harry Wrathall (1 February 1869 – 1 June 1944) was an English cricketer who played for Gloucestershire, Marylebone and London County.

Career
Between 1894 and 1907, Wrathall played in 288 first-class matches. The right handed batsman played 509 innings with an average of 22.54. Wrathall's right-arm medium pace bowling took 30 wickets averaging at 45.26.

References

1869 births
1944 deaths
English cricketers of 1890 to 1918
English cricketers
Sportspeople from Cheltenham
Gloucestershire cricketers
London County cricketers
Marylebone Cricket Club cricketers
Players cricketers
Midland Counties cricketers
North v South cricketers
Northumberland cricketers
Players of the South cricketers